Fisher Branch is a stream in Lewis County in the U.S. state of Missouri. It is a tributary of Reddish Branch.

Fisher Branch has the name of the original owner of the site.

See also
List of rivers of Missouri

References

Rivers of Lewis County, Missouri
Rivers of Missouri